Andrej Martin and Igor Zelenay were the defending champions but only Zelenay returned, partnering Hans Podlipnik. Zelenay lost in the semifinals to Andre Begemann and Aliaksandr Bury.

Begemann and Bury won the title after defeating Roman Jebavý and Zdeněk Kolář 5–7, 6–4, [11–9] in the final.

Seeds

Draw

References
 Main Draw

Internazionali di Tennis del Friuli Venezia Giulia - Doubles
Friuli